The Ofudesaki (おふでさき, "Tip of the Writing Brush") is the most important scripture in Tenrikyo. It is one of Tenrikyo's three scriptures (sangenten 三原典), along with the Mikagura-uta ("The Songs for the Service") and the Osashizu ("Divine Directions"). A 17-volume collection of 1,711 waka poems, the Ofudesaki was composed by the foundress of Tenrikyo, Miki Nakayama, from 1869 to 1882.

Etymology and meaning
The name Ofudesaki can be split into three smaller segments. O is an honorific prefix, fude translates to "brush," and saki translates to "tip." Thus, the Ofudesaki has been referred to in English as The Tip of the Writing Brush. It was even once referred to as "The Book of Revelations" in early English Tenrikyo literature. It is a convention in Tenrikyo literature to write Ofudesaki in hiragana (おふでさき) as opposed to kanji.

Nakayama's intention for the Ofudesaki is explained in the scripture itself:This is a world constructed on reason. So I shall press upon you everything with the reason in verse. / 
I shall press, though not by force or word of mouth. I shall press by the tip of My writing brush. /
It is all very well if you err in nothing. But should you err, I shall inform you by verse. (Ofudesaki I:21–23)

Content

The main theme of the Ofudesaki has been described as "a development toward the perfection of Tsutome, the Service, through which, alone, human salvation can be realized." To that end, the Ofudesaki addresses other themes such as the purpose of human existence, the definition of good and evil, the cause of illness, the relationship between God, humans, and the universe, socio-ethical principles, and eschatology. 

The Ofudesaki addresses these themes in different ways. Sometimes the verses employ simple metaphors and allegories. Other times the verses are instructions originally intended for specific people in Miki Nakayama's day.

History

Background
The inscription of Part I of the Ofudesaki reads, "From the 1st month in the 2nd year of Meiji, the year of the Serpent", which means that the composition of the Ofudesaki began sometime in 1869 according to the Gregorian calendar. This year saw the end of the Boshin War, a civil war between the ruling forces of the Tokugawa shogunate and those seeking to return political power to the Imperial Court, and the beginning of the Meiji Restoration, a period of modernization and reform for the Empire of Japan. 

The inscription continues with the words, "An old woman of 72 years." The ‘old woman’ refers to Miki Nakayama, who at that point had been allegedly possessed by a god for about three decades. In 1853, she had the Nakayama family's main house dismantled and sold and had the remaining rice fields mortgaged a couple of years later. In 1864, a carpenter from Ichinomoto Village named Izo Iburi visited Miki Nakayama, and as a gesture of gratitude, constructed a place where followers could pray, laying down the foundation for the structure known today as Tenrikyo Church Headquarters. From 1866 to 1869, she taught her followers a prayer service.

Composition
An oral account of the writing of the Ofudesaki has been recorded in a Tenrikyo supplementary text (jungenten 準原典) known as the Anecdotes of Oyasama. A follower named Shirobei Umetani recalled Miki Nakayama saying:
You know there is the Fudesaki. What do you think of it? The seventeen parts of the Fudesaki were not completed in a short while. God spoke into my ears, saying, ‘Do not look at any writings, even the charge book from a bean curd shop.’ I wondered why. Then God said, ‘Brush, brush, take up the brush.’ I took the brush up for the first time at New Year’s when I became seventy-two years old. And when I took the brush up, My hand moved by itself. From heaven, God did it. After what was to be done was finished, My hand became numb and it could not be moved. God said, ‘Calm Your mind, and read this. If You find something You cannot understand, ask Me.’ I added brush strokes when I found something I could not understand. That is the Fudesaki.

The seventeen parts of the Ofudesaki were written as follows (brackets indicate that the date is based on assumption since no date is inscribed):

Nakayama composed over half of the total number of Ofudesaki verses (i.e. Part III to Part XI) in the years 1874–1875.

Exterior Volume
In addition to the manuscripts kept at her residence, Nakayama produced manuscripts that were given to individual followers. The term "exterior volume" (gesatsu) comes from an inscription written by the Maegawas (Miki's birth family) in Sanmaiden Village on the cover of one of the manuscript portions that Nakayama gave to them on 18 June 1874. She presented them to the Maegawas as a gesture of gratitude for making the kagura masks that were to be used in the prayer service she taught her followers. The inscription reads, "An exterior volume. Written by God. Written in Her seventy-seventh year." The Maegawas used the term to distinguish the portions they received from Nakayama from the original Ofudesaki kept at her residence, even though their portions were also in Nakayama's handwriting. The second Shinbashira (leader of Tenrikyo), Shozen Nakayama, later adopted the term to refer to the fourteen verses that were written in Miki Nakayama's handwriting and given away. Though these verses are considered to be the unnumbered verses of the Ofudesaki, they are not published with the Ofudesaki.

Publication
Though Miki Nakayama had completed the Ofudesaki in 1882, the scriptures were not printed until 1928. Until then the Ofudesaki was only available in the form of hand-copied manuscripts.

In March 1883, the local police visited the Nakayama residence and attempted to confiscate the Ofudesaki manuscripts so that they could be destroyed. However, Shinnosuke Nakayama, the grandson of Miki, claimed that two women at the residence, Omasa and Osato, had already burned them in compliance with a patrolman's order. Thereby the Ofudesaki manuscripts remained intact, and have survived to this day.
 
In 1939, Tenrikyo Church Headquarters announced the change of its doctrine and ritual, under pressure to comply with the demands of State Shinto. Copies of the Ofudesaki and the Osashizu (Divine Directions) were recalled from local churches, and the Ofudesaki was not allowed to be preached until the end of World War II. With the adoption of the Constitution of Japan in 1947 and the establishment of freedom of religion in Japan, Tenrikyo Church Headquarters was legally allowed to restore its scriptures to their original form and disseminate them freely. On 26 July 1948, an Ofudesaki with interpretive explanations was published and offered to all local churches.

Since then the Ofudesaki has been translated into a number of languages. A trial translation was published in series in the journal Fukugen from 1946–7. The first edition English translation was published in 1971, and the sixth edition (the most recent as of 2017) was published in 1993. A volume containing the English (sixth edition), Japanese, and romanization (2nd edition) was published in 1998.

Style

Poetic form and script
The verses of the Ofudesaki are generally in a traditional poetic style known as waka. A waka poem contains thirty-one syllables and is subdivided into two lines. The Ofudesaki is mostly written in a Japanese phonetic syllabary (a precursor to modern hiragana) and employs relatively few kanji (only forty-nine distinct characters).

Grammar and syntax
Nakayama wrote the Ofudesaki in her native language and dialect, the Japanese language in a dialect called Yamato kotoba or the "language of the Yamato region." Her script seems to be consistent with how rural people in Japan wrote during the late Edo period, when the standardized writing system had yet to be widely adopted. However, as of 2010, a detailed grammatical study has yet to be made of the language of the Ofudesaki.

Commentaries so far have tended to explain specific terms from the perspective that the language of the Ofudesaki is not significantly different from the commonly spoken language of the day, meaning that it suffices to understand the Ofudesaki as a reader of that place and time would have understood it. However, the Ofudesaki contains certain syntactical features that require particular care in interpretation, such as non-indicative moods that may be referred to as subjunctive, optative, or imperative. For example, there are verses that should be construed as an imperative, which indicates a command, but are constructed as an optative expressing a wish.

References

Further reading
 
Inoue, Akio and Enyon, Matthew. A Study of the Ofudesaki. 2nd edition, Tenrikyo Doyusha, 1987, Tenri, Japan.
Nakayama, Shozen. Thoughts on a Thematic Outline of the Ofudesaki.

External links 
"The Ofudesaki, The Tip of the Writing Brush" by Yoshikazu Fukaya
"Tenrikyō" from World Religions & Spirituality Project

Tenrikyo
Religious texts